Andrea Cossu may refer to:
 Andrea Cossu (footballer, born 1980), Italian former footballer
 Andrea Cossu (footballer, born 1984), Italian footballer of Nigerian descent